Wermlands Brygghus is a microbrewery  located in Kristinehamn,  Värmland, in the west of central Sweden. 

The brewery was founded in 2012 by Hans and Christina Skan. It is the first microbrewery in Värmland and the first operating brewery in Kristinehamn since 1957, when the then last operating brewery was taken over by Pripps and subsequently closed.

Brewing started in 2013 and the first beer brewed was the Wermlands Premiärbrygd. The Wermlands Premiärbrygd was originally intended  to be a one-time production, but has since become brewed on regular basis.

Wermlands Brygghus has seen substantial growth since its founding. Yearly production was 100,000 liters in 2016, compared to 45,000 liters in 2013.
 By 2016, the brewery had two full-time employees and two part-time employees.
 
The brewery moved from its first premises outside Kristinehamn to much larger premises near the train station in Kristinehamn in 2017. The new place measures 700 square meters, with 10 meters in ceiling height. The brewery is now housed one of the old brick buildings belonging to former turbine-producer Kristinehamn Turbin AB (now Blue Future Turbine AB). The building dates back to 1913 and is part of the local industrial heritage. With the new premises and investments in new equipment, the brewery increased its capacity and aimed to successively increase yearly production to 500,000 liters. The new premises also made possible a brew pub, which opened on 30 April 2017.

The brewery had an assortment of 12 beers, including a seasonal Christmas beer and five low-alcohol beers as of 2017. 

The brewery offers tours and openings for both private persons and companies. In addition, the brewery also offers a brew pub, where the assortment can be tasted at regular occasions.

Distribution 
Distribution is mainly concentrated to Värmland in central Sweden. The beers can be found at certain pubs, restaurants and hotels. The low-alcohol beers can also be found at various grocery stores. By 2016, at approximately one hundred grocery stores in central and southern Sweden. The standard alcohol beers can also be found or, when not included in the local standard assortment, specially ordered at Systembolaget. As of 2016, beers from Wermlands Brygghus can be found at 14 Systembolaget stores in Värmland.

References

External links 
 Wermlands Brygghus (Swedish)
 Systembolaget (Swedish)

Companies based in Värmland County
Breweries in Sweden